Harvey High School may refer to:  

 Harvey High School, in Harvey Station, New Brunswick
 Thomas W. Harvey High School, in Painesville, Ohio
 Harvey Milk High School, in East Village, Manhattan
 Harvey Senior High School, in Harvey, Western Australia